Llanrhaiadr Mochnant railway station was a station near Llanrhaeadr-ym-Mochnant, Powys, Wales, on the Tanat Valley Light Railway. The station opened in 1904 and closed to passengers in 1951 and completely in 1964. The station was situated a mile south-east of the village and on the west side of a level crossing. It had two platforms and a passing loop as well as sidings to a goods yard and cattle dock.

References

Further reading

Disused railway stations in Powys
Railway stations in Great Britain opened in 1904
Railway stations in Great Britain closed in 1951
Former Cambrian Railway stations